= NAACP Image Award for Outstanding Variety Special =

Former American television award

The NAACP Image Award for Outstanding Variety Special: began as a category in 1994 after being part of the larger category Outstanding Variety Series/Special from 1988 to 1993. It ceased in 1996 when the category reverted to the original Outstanding Variety Series/Special.

== Winners & Nominees ==
Year	Television Series	Nominees
1994	Great Performances for episode "Natalie Cole: Unforgettable with Love"	
1995	Sinbad Live From New York: Afros & Bellbottoms	
